Choi Hye-jin (born 23 August 1999) is a South Korean professional golfer.

Amateur career
Choi represented South Korea at the 2014 Asian Games where she helped the team to a silver medal and finished fifth in the individual event. She help the Korean team to a third place finish at the 2014 Espirito Santo Trophy.

In 2015, Choi won the World Junior Girls Championship, both individually and with the South Korean team.

Choi won the 2016 Canadian Women's Amateur and was low amateur at the 2016 U.S. Women's Open. She led the Korean team to victory at the 2016 Espirito Santo Trophy. She also finished runner-up at the 2016 New Zealand Women's Open, co-sanctioned by the ALPG Tour and the Ladies European Tour.

Choi won the 2017 Australian Women's Amateur and also won the ChoJung Sparkling Water Yongpyong Resort Open on the 2017 LPGA of Korea Tour. She finished second at the 2017 U.S. Women's Open at the age of seventeen. She was attempting to become the second amateur to win the U.S. Open. She won a second LPGA of Korea Tour event in August 2017, the Bogner-MBN Ladies Open.

Professional career
Choi turned professional in August 2017.

She was runner-up at the 2018 ISPS Handa Women's Australian Open, an LPGA Tour event.

In 2019, she won five events and was LPGA of Korea Tour leading money winner.

Choi earned her card for the 2022 LPGA Tour through qualifying school.

Amateur wins
2015 Korean Women's Amateur - KangMinKoo Cup, World Junior Girls Championship (individual)
2016 Lake Macquarie International Championship, Neighbors Trophy Team Championship, Hosim Cup, Canadian Women's Amateur, Song Am Cup, Polo Golf Junior Classic
2017 Australian Women's Amateur, Neighbors Trophy Team Championship, Queen Sirikit Cup

Source:

Professional wins (12)

LPGA of Korea Tour wins (11)
2017 (2) ChoJung Sparkling Water Yongpyong Resort Open (as amateur), Bogner-MBN Ladies Open (as amateur)
2018 (2) Hyosung Championship, BC Card-Hankyung Ladies Cup
2019 (5) CreaS F&C KLPGA Championship, NH Investment & Securities Ladies Championship, S-Oil Championship, McCol-Yongpyong Resort Open, SK Networks Seokyung Ladies Classic
2020 (2) S-Oil Championship, SK Telecom–ADT CAPS Championship

Other wins
2017 LF Point Final Championship

Results in LPGA majors

CUT = missed the half-way cut
T = tied

World ranking
Position in Women's World Golf Rankings at the end of each calendar year.

Team appearances
Amateur
Asian Games (representing South Korea): 2014
Espirito Santo Trophy (representing South Korea): 2014, 2016 (winners)
Patsy Hankins Trophy (representing Asia/Pacific): 2016 (winners)
World Junior Girls Championship (representing South Korea): 2015 (winners)

Source:

References

External links
Choi Hye-jin at the KLPGA Tour official site 

South Korean female golfers
LPGA of Korea Tour golfers
LPGA Tour golfers
Asian Games medalists in golf
Asian Games silver medalists for South Korea
Golfers at the 2014 Asian Games
Medalists at the 2014 Asian Games
Sportspeople from South Gyeongsang Province
People from Gimhae
1999 births
Living people